Abdelkarim Fachtali (born 30 March 1988) is a Moroccan football striker whose last known club was KaisarHe also holds Dutch citizenship.

Career
Fachtali is a striker who made his debut in professional football, being part of the NEC Nijmegen squad in the 2006–07 season.

For the 2008–09 season, Fachtali played in a one-season loan deal for TOP Oss in the Jupiler League.
In July 2009 he left NEC on a free transfer and signed with FC Oss until 2010. However, in December 2009 he left FC Oss after a conflict about his mentality. In January 2010 he has trained a few weeks with FC Omniworld/Almere City FC, and signed a contract until the end of the season. In the summer of 2011 Fachtali was signed by RKC Waalwijk, where he played only 5 matches in the first half of the season. He was sent on loan to Go Ahead Eagles for the rest of the season. He was set free by RKC Waalwijk and signed with FC Kaisar Kyzylorda from Kazakhstan.

References

External links
 NEC Profile
 Spelers Profile
 Mountakhab.net Profile
 NEC Fan Profile
 Voetbal International Profile
 Der Trouwe Honden Profile

1988 births
Living people
People from Oriental (Morocco)
Moroccan footballers
Moroccan expatriate footballers
Moroccan expatriate sportspeople in the Netherlands
Moroccan emigrants to the Netherlands
Expatriate footballers in the Netherlands
Expatriate footballers in Kazakhstan
NEC Nijmegen players
Almere City FC players
TOP Oss players
RKC Waalwijk players
Go Ahead Eagles players
Eredivisie players
Eerste Divisie players
People with acquired Dutch citizenship
Association football forwards